The UK Indie Chart is a weekly chart that ranks the biggest-selling singles that are released on independent record labels in the United Kingdom. The chart is compiled by the Official Charts Company, and is based on both physical and digital single sales. In 2011, eleven different singles have topped the chart – with singer Adele and musician Example each claiming three of them.

Summary
2011 opened with British-singer Adele continuing her reign at the top of the chart. Having first reached the peak on 3 October 2010; the cover of "Make You Feel My Love" spent a total of 10 weeks at the peak – 8 during the course of 2010, on four non-consecutive runs.

Adele's reign was then ended when Sound of 2011 nominee Nero reached number-one on the chart with their single "Me & You"; although after one week Adele had returned to the peak. Adele then replaced herself at the top of the chart with the lead single from second studio album 21, entitled "Rolling in the Deep"; which also debuted at number 2 on the UK Singles Chart. The single spent a total of four consecutive weeks at the peak before again being replaced by another single by herself, this time with the second single from 21, "Someone Like You"; which following from a performance at the 2011 Brit Awards climbed to number-one on the UK Singles Chart, marking Adele's first number-one.

After an incredible nine consecutive weeks at the peak, "Someone Like You" was dethroned on 24 April by Wretch 32 and Example's collaborative single "Unorthodox" – which having peaked at number 2 on the singles chart remained at the top spot for three consecutive weeks. On 15 May, Iranian singer Yasmin debuted at number-one on the chart with second single "Finish Line", although its time at the peak was short lived when Adele's "Someone Like You" returned to the number-one spot to continue a non-consecutive run currently totalling seventeen weeks.

Adele was then dethroned for a third time during 2011 when French DJ Alex Gaudino topped the chart with Kelly Rowland-collaborated "What a Feeling" on 4 June. The following week, rapper Example scored a number-one single with "Changed the Way You Kiss Me" – which also topped the singles and dance chart. The single marked the second number-one single from the musician in 2011 alone, having already claimed number-one singles with "Won't Go Quietly" (2010) and "Kickstarts" (2010). Having spent four consecutive weeks at the peak, Example was dethroned on 10 July by Ministry of Sound artist DJ Fresh with the Sian Evans-assisted "Louder" – which also topped the singles chart.

Following on from an impressive six weeks at the peak, 21 August saw Wretch 32 claim a second number-one single with the Josh Kumra-assisted "Don't Go" – which, much like the predecessor, topped the singles chart. The single spent two weeks at the number-one spot before musician Example claimed a third number-one single of the year with "Stay Awake" – marking his fifth number-one single overall.

Number-one singles

 – The single was simultaneously number-one on the Singles Chart.

Number-one artists

See also

List of UK Dance Singles Chart number ones of 2011
List of UK Independent Albums Chart number ones of 2011
List of UK Singles Downloads Chart number ones of the 2000s
List of UK Rock & Metal Singles Chart number ones of 2011
List of UK R&B Singles Chart number ones of 2011

References

External links
Independent Singles Chart at the Official Charts Company
UK Top 30 Indie Singles Chart at BBC Radio 1

Number-one indie singles
United Kingdom Indie Singles
Indie 2011